In digestion, a bolus (from Latin bolus, "ball") is a ball-like mixture of food and saliva that forms in the mouth during the process of chewing (which is largely an adaptation for plant-eating mammals). It has the same color as the food being eaten, and the saliva gives it an alkaline pH.

Under normal circumstances, the bolus is swallowed, and travels down the esophagus to the stomach for digestion.

See also
Chyme
Chyle

References

Digestive system